The Eisenhower Trophy (World Men's Amateur Team Championships) is the biennial World Amateur Team Championship for men organized by the International Golf Federation. Since the tournament was first played in 1958, it is named after Dwight D. Eisenhower, the President of the United States at the time, who was a keen amateur golfer. The equivalent competition for women is the Espirito Santo Trophy.

Results

The 1958 championship resulted in a tie. There was an 18-hole playoff which Australia won with a score of 222 to the United States 224.

From 1958 to 2000 the teams had four players with the best three scores counting for each round. From 2002 the teams have been three players with two counting. The 2004, 2010 and 2012 championships were reduced to 54 holes because of bad weather.

Players who have featured in a winning Eisenhower Trophy team and later become leading professional golfers include: Jack Nicklaus, Bruce Fleisher, Tom Kite, Lanny Wadkins, Ben Crenshaw, Curtis Strange, Scott Hoch, Hal Sutton, Michael Campbell, Tiger Woods, Ben Curtis and Luke Donald.

Results summary

There were joint silver medalists (and no bronze medalists) in 1982 and 1990. There were joint bronze medalists in 1992, 2002, 2012 (3) and 2016.

The "Great Britain and Ireland" team represented the two separate independent countries of the United Kingdom and the Republic of Ireland from 1958 to 2000. From 2002, England, Scotland, Wales, and Ireland (a combined Republic of Ireland and Northern Ireland team) have competed as separate teams.

Of the teams that have competed in all 31 championships, only Bermuda has never won a medal; Bermuda's best finish was 16th in 1958.

Source:

Individual leader

Future sites
2023 Jumeirah Golf Estates, UAE
2025 Tanah Merah Country Club (Tampines Course), Singapore
2027 Royal Golf Dar Es Salam, Morocco

References

 
Amateur golf tournaments
Team golf tournaments
Recurring sporting events established in 1958
1958 establishments in Scotland